The Burnside Methodist Church is a historic church off U.S. 27 in Burnside, Kentucky.  It was built in 1907 and added to the National Register in 1985.

It is a cruciform-plan Victorian Gothic brick building on a rusticated limestone foundation.

The listing includes a church parsonage built in 1902 at cost of $900.00.

References

Methodist churches in Kentucky
Churches on the National Register of Historic Places in Kentucky
Gothic Revival church buildings in Kentucky
Churches completed in 1907
20th-century Methodist church buildings in the United States
National Register of Historic Places in Pulaski County, Kentucky
1902 establishments in Kentucky
Houses completed in 1902
Houses on the National Register of Historic Places in Kentucky
Clergy houses in the United States
Houses in Pulaski County, Kentucky